The gaur is a large dark-coated bovine animal of South Asia and Southeast Asia.

Gaur may also refer to:
Gaur (artistic group), a Basque artistic group established in 1966 at Gipuzkoa, Spain
River Gaur in Perthshire
Gaur, an early transcription for Jushur, founder of 1st Dynasty of Kish according to the Sumerian King List
Gaur, Nepal, a town in the Rautahat district of Nepal
Gaur, West Bengal (also called Gour or Lakhnauti), a ruined city in the Malda district of West Bengal, India
Gaur Brahmin, a Brahmin community native to North India
Another spelling for Giaour

See also
 Gour (disambiguation)
 Guar

ca:Gaur